The Multiple Indicator Cluster Surveys (MICS) are household surveys implemented by countries under the programme developed by the United Nations Children's Fund to provide internationally comparable, statistically rigorous data on the situation of children and women. The first round of surveys (MICS1) was carried out in over 60 countries in mainly 1995 and 1996 in response to the World Summit for Children and measurement of the mid-decade progress. A second round (MICS2) in 2000 increased the depth of the survey, allowing monitoring of a larger number of globally agreed indicators. A third round (MICS3) started in 2006 and aimed at producing data measuring progress also toward the Millennium Development Goals (MDGs), A World Fit for Children, and other major relevant international commitments. The fourth round, launched in 2009, aimed at most data collection conducted in 2010, but in reality most MICS4s were implemented in 2011 and even into 2012 and 2013. This represented a scale-up of frequency of MICS from UNICEF, now offering the survey programme on a three-year cycle. The fifth round, launched in 2012, was aimed at offering countries the tools to do the final MDG data collection.

In 2016, the sixth round was launched with an effort towards collecting baseline data for the new set of global goals and targets - the Sustainable Development Goals (SDGs). As of mid-2022, a total of more than 350 surveys have been completed in 119 countries and territories.

The MICS is highly comparable to the Demographic and Health Survey (DHS) and the technical teams developing and supporting the surveys are in close collaboration.

Survey tools

At the core of MICS is the list of indicators. In MICS6 this is a compilation of now 200 distinct indicators (237 counting those requiring sex disaggregate). The list is not inclusive of all standard tabulations produced in a full survey, but forms those that are central to global monitoring by UNICEF and others. The list is a central message in MICS, as no question is asked in the questionnaires without directly contributing to an indicator algorithm or a background variable. Thus, survey-specific additional questions are always suggested to follow the same guidelines: No question should be asked without a clear plan for tabulation of results.

Questionnaires 

The MICS questionnaires are:

 Household, administered to any knowledgeable adult member of the household (in MICS1–MICS3 this was to the head of household).
 Women, administered to all eligible women (age 15–49) of the household.
 Children under age five, administered to their mothers. If the mother is not listed as a member of the household, a primary caregiver is identified as the respondent to this questionnaire.
 As of 2011, a questionnaire for men (age 15–49) has also been developed and is included in the generic set of questionnaires.
 As of MICS6, a questionnaire for children age 5–17, administered to the mother of a randomly selected child per household.

In MICS, the generic questionnaires include all modules, such that implementers only should remove non-applicable or non-desired modules and questions, e.g. the ITN module in non-malarious countries.

The full set of generic modules include:
Household Questionnaire
 Household Information Panel
 List of Household Members
 Education
 Household Characteristics
 Social Transfers
 Household Energy Use
 Insecticide Treated Nets
 Water and Sanitation
 Handwashing
 Salt Iodisation
 Water Quality (a module, but designed as a separate questionnaire, due to sub-sample selection)

Individual Questionnaire for Women
 Woman's Information Panel
 Woman's Background
 Mass Media and ICT
 Fertility/Birth History (Mortality)
 Desire for Last Birth
 Maternal and Newborn Health
 Post-Natal Health Checks
 Contraception
 Unmet Need
 Female Genital Mutilation/Cutting
 Attitudes Toward Domestic Violence
 Victimization
 Marriage/Union
 Adult Functioning
 Sexual Behaviour
 HIV/AIDS
 Maternal Mortality
 Tobacco and Alcohol Use
 Life Satisfaction

Questionnaire for Children Under Five
 Under-five Child Information Panel
 Under-Five's Background
 Birth Registration
 Early Childhood Development
 Child Discipline
 Child Functioning
 Breastfeeding and Dietary Intake
 Immunisation
 Anthropometry

Individual Questionnaire for Men
 Man's Information Panel
 Man's Background
 Access to Mass Media and Use of ICT
 Fertility
 Attitudes Toward Domestic Violence
 Marriage/Union
 Sexual Behaviour
 HIV/AIDS
 Circumcision
 Tobacco and Alcohol Use
 Life Satisfaction

Questionnaire for Children Age 5-17
 Child's Information Panel
 Child's Background
 Child Labour
 Child Discipline
 Child Functioning
 Parental Involvement
 Foundational Learning Skills

Other tools 

The MICS package also includes data entry program (in CSPro) catering for paper-based or tablet-based data collection, standard tabulation plan (in Excel) and syntax (in SPSS), workshop training programmes, in-country capacity building and technical assistance, data dissemination templates, as well as various online resources, such as a survey data compiler (MICS Compiler).

The tools are all compiled on the MICS website, which was launched in an modernized format in March, 2015.

Current status 

The 6th round of MICS commenced in October 2016 with the initiation of the Programme's Survey Design Workshops and was scheduled to run to 2021 (this has since been extended to 2022, mainly due to COVID-19 related delays of face-to-face surveys). The content is expanded to cover new priorities, including adjustments to cover approximately half of the survey-based SDG indicators (about 40 of about 80).

The 6th round's tools were piloted in Costa Rica in mid-2016, and was preceded by a Field Test of new or refined questionnaire modules and tools for data collection and processing in Belize end of 2015. In November 2017 additional questionnaire modules were tested in Malawi. A similar exercise was conducted in Belize in April 2019.

The MICS Programme is participating in methodological development of new data collection tools, such as on water quality testing, child disability, external economic support, and impact of emergencies. A methodological paper series was launched in 2012.

The programme has been evaluated following rounds 1, 3 and 4.

Funding

The total cost for MICS3 was about $18.6 million (and about $356,000 per country) according to a 2008 MICS evaluation.

MICS4 was estimated to cost $31.3 million.

Countries 
The countries listed below have conducted (or plan to conduct) a MICS survey. Reports and data are available on the MICS website.

X: National Survey
S: Sub-national Survey

Note: Only countries from UNICEF's official list are included. It appears that some surveys are based on the MICS tools, but not included in the list, e.g. Botswana 2007-08 Family Health Survey and Bangladesh 2009 Progotir Pathey (MICS).

The total number of countries having ever conducted a MICS (or plan to do so) is 119. This includes Yugoslavia, which at the time of MICS1 and MICS2 was the territory now split into Kosovo, Montenegro, and Serbia. In MICS5, five countries were new to the programme: Benin, Congo, El Salvador, Mexico, and Paraguay. In MICS6, eight additional countries have conducted or are planning surveys: The Federated States of Micronesia, Fiji, Honduras, Kiribati, Nauru, Samoa, Tonga and Tuvalu, as well as the British Overseas Territory of Turks and Caicos Islands.

Use of survey data
Survey data are widely used, predominantly in multi-country analyses, but also often for simple trend analyses in single countries. An example of use of MICS data is provided by Monasch et al. (2004).

Due to the near perfect comparability between MICS and DHS, much analysis draws on multiple data sets of both programmes. However, each survey programme have modules specific to their mandates and not often used in both programmes. For example, a recent compilation of evidence on child discipline makes use of surveys that included the Child Discipline Module; these were all MICS. UNICEF (2010).

Most global statistics, such as on the indicators of the MDGs rely heavily on data collected through MICS (and other household surveys), particularly for countries where administrative reporting systems are not entirely adequate. Other global statistics rely on only household survey data, such as the Multidimensional Poverty Index developed by OPHI and reported by UNDP.

Examples of recent publications are listed under external links.

References

External links

Recent examples of use of MICS data 
 Takeuchi, LR (2015), "Intra-household inequalities in child rights and wellbeing: a barrier to progress?". ODI Development Progress, Research Report 02, March 2015
 Arabi, M., Frongillo, E. A., Avula, R. and Mangasaryan, N. (2012), "Infant and Young Child Feeding in Developing Countries". Child Development, 83: 32–45.
 Sipsma et al. (2012), "Female genital cutting: current practices and beliefs in western Africa". Bull World Health Organ 2012;90:120–127F
 Cappa, C. and Khan, SM (2011), "Understanding caregivers’ attitudes towards physical punishment of children: Evidence from 34 low- and middle-income countries". Child Abuse & Neglect. Volume 35, Issue 12, December 2011, Pages 1009–1021

Household survey programme websites 
 UNICEF Multiple Indicator Cluster Surveys (MICS)
 USAID Demographic and Health Surveys (DHS)
 World Bank Living Standard Measurement Study (LSMS)
 WHO Global Adult Tobacco Survey (GATS)
 Generations & Gender Programme (GGP)
 ILO Statistical Information and Monitoring Programme on Child Labour (SIMPOC)
 Standardized Monitoring and Assessment of Relief and Transitions (SMART)
 World Values Survey (WVS)

Regional programmes 
 Arab League Pan-Arab Project for Family Health (PAPFAM)
 EU Statistics on Income and Living Conditions (EU-SILC)

Networks 
 International Household Survey Network (IHSN)
 The Inter-secretariat Group on Household Surveys (ISWGHS)

Other related links 
 UNICEF website
 UNICEF statistics
 MICS Compiler
 Global Child Mortality Estimates
 WHO/UNICEF Joint Monitoring Programme for Water Supply and Sanitation
 The World Inequality Database on Education (WIDE)
 Oxford Poverty and Human Development Initiative

Social statistics data
Childhood
UNICEF
Statistical data agreements
Household surveys